Kickapoo High School may refer to:

Kickapoo High School (Springfield, Missouri)
Kickapoo High School (Viola, Wisconsin)